Edward Hazen Walker was a politician from the province of Saskatchewan in Canada.

Career 
He represented Gravelbourg on the Legislative Assembly, replacing E. M. Culliton who joined the Saskatchewan Court of Appeal.

References 

Saskatchewan Co-operative Commonwealth Federation MLAs
20th-century Canadian politicians